The We Will Rock You: 10th Anniversary Tour is world tour started in February 2013, by the We Will Rock You Musical celebrating the musical's tenth anniversary. Although the tour will technically take place between the musical's eleventh and twelfth anniversaries. The tour will play to audiences around the world while the record-breaking run at London's Dominion Theatre will continue.

Background
Following the triumphant 2010 and 2011 UK theatre tours, the smash hit Queen and Ben Elton musical, We Will Rock You announces the show will embark on its first ever world arena tour. With 24 of Queen's biggest hits delivered in a show that boasts the scale and spectacle that marked the bands’ legendary live performances, this will be one of the most spectacular musicals to tour the world.

Unprecedented success in theatres around the world has paved the way for We Will Rock You to make the step into arenas, where the Rock Theatrical will be performed in front of thousands of rock fans every night. The world tour will see the show visit arenas in Finland, Denmark, the Netherlands, Luxembourg, Czech Republic, Turkey, Bulgaria, Croatia and the UK and Ireland in 2013. Further dates in Japan, South Africa, New Zealand and Australia will be announced shortly. Due to the Leeds Arena not being completed on time, it will not be a playable venue by the time of the shows. All shows originally scheduled for Newcastle's Metro Radio Arena we moved to the dates of the original Leeds shows, which have been indefinitely postponed until the dates can be rescheduled.

On 7 March 2013 QueenOnline announced that there will also be a national tour of the United States, beginning in Baltimore in October and currently will visit Chicago, Pittsburgh, Boston, Minneapolis, Thunder Bay, Miami, For Myers, Columbus, Houston, Detroit, Providence, Tampa, Charlotte, Des Moines and Los Angeles

Tour dates

Cancellations and rescheduled shows

Casts

Celebrity appearances
Brian May
27 March 2013, Nottingham ("Bohemian Rhapsody")
16 October 2013, Baltimore ("Bohemian Rhapsody")

Creatives, on the musical

Critical reception
The UK Tour has received a generally positive response:

However, in Manchester it received poor response from reviews:

On opening in the US the musical was met with mixed reviews:

References

External links
QueenOnline.com – Queen's official website
WeWillRockYou.co.uk – We Will Rock You's official website

2013 concert tours
2014 concert tours